Nawang Dendup (also pronounced Dhendup, born 20 September 1980) is a Bhutanese former footballer and manager. He made his first appearance for the Bhutan national football team in 2005.

Career statistics

International goals

References

1986 births
Bhutanese footballers
Bhutan international footballers
Transport United F.C. players
Living people
Association football midfielders